Daniel Alrik "Dan" Sundén-Cullberg (6 April 1907 – 27 January 1982) was a Swedish sailor. He was a crew member of the boat Swedisk Star that won the bronze medal in the Star class at the 1932 Summer Olympics.

References

1907 births
1982 deaths
Swedish male sailors (sport)
Olympic sailors of Sweden
Olympic bronze medalists for Sweden
Olympic medalists in sailing
Medalists at the 1932 Summer Olympics
Sailors at the 1932 Summer Olympics – Star
Royal Swedish Yacht Club sailors
Sportspeople from Stockholm